Viktória Kužmová and Aleksandra Pospelova were the defending champions, however Pospelova was no longer eligible to compete. Kužmová played alongside Federica Bilardo, but lost in the first round to Nicole Frenkel and Sofia Kenin. 

Jada Hart and Ena Shibahara won the title, defeating Kayla Day and Caroline Dolehide in the final, 4–6, 6–2, [13–11].

Seeds

Draw

Finals

Top half

Bottom half

External links 
 Main draw

Girls' Doubles
US Open, 2016 Girls' Doubles